{{Infobox song
| name       = Like I Can
| cover      = Sam Smith Like I Can.png
| alt        =
| type       = single
| artist     = Sam Smith
| album      = In the Lonely Hour
| released   = 5 December 2014
| recorded   = 2013
| studio     =
| venue      =
| genre      = Power pop<ref name="NPR Review">{{cite web |url= https://www.npr.org/2014/06/08/319254479/first-listen-sam-smith-in-the-lonely-hour/ |title= First Listen: Sam Smith, 'In The Lonely Hour |work=NPR |last= Fitzgerald |first=Kiana |date=8 June 2014 |accessdate=24 November 2021}} </ref>
| length     = 2:47
| label      =
 Capitol
 Method
| writer     =
 Sam Smith
 Matt Prime
| producer   =
 Steve Fitzmaurice
 Jimmy Napes
 Mojam
| prev_title = I'm Not the Only One
| prev_year  = 2014
| next_title = Have Yourself a Merry Little Christmas
| next_year  = 2014
}}

"Like I Can" is a song by English singer Sam Smith. It was released as a digital download on 5 December 2014 as the fifth single from their debut studio album, In the Lonely Hour (2014). The song was written by Smith and Matt Prime and produced by Steve Fitzmaurice, Jimmy Napes and Mojam. It debuted and peaked at number 9 in the United Kingdom, becoming Smith's fifth UK top 10 single.

Background and inspiration
On 24 October 2014, Smith announced via Twitter that they would be releasing "Like I Can" as the fifth single from their debut album In the Lonely Hour. They posted, "Incredibly happy to announce that my next single will be LIKE I CAN!!".

The song was used to describe painful, loneliness that love back to a man's unavoidable desire for love and minimise the painful emotion was throughout this song.

Commercial performance
"Like I Can" peaked at number 9 on the UK Singles Chart, giving Smith their fifth UK top 10 single. It was the 100th biggest-selling song of 2014 in the United Kingdom, as well as the 58th biggest in 2015. It has also charted at number 19 in New Zealand, number 20 in Australia, and number 99 in the United States.

Music video
The music video is in black and white and features Smith and several men on what appears to be a stag party.

Live performances
Smith performed the song on 9 November 2014, on the fifth live results show of series 11 of The X Factor.

Track listing

Covers
On October 12, 2015, Jordan Smith and Regina Love covered as a duet battle through song choice selection in The Voice.

On February 25, 2016, Trent Harmon covered the song during the Top 10 round on the fifteenth season of American Idol.

On October 24, 2016, Dave Moisan sang this song during the knockout rounds in The Voice''.

Appearances in media
In mid-August 2021, the song went viral on TikTok, appearing in more than 2.4M videos as of September 25, 2021 at 6:59 PM EDT. This song also previously went viral over there back in May 2020.

Charts and certifications

Weekly charts

Year-end charts

Certifications and sales

Release history

References

2014 songs
2014 singles
Sam Smith (singer) songs
Songs written by Matt Prime
Capitol Records singles
Songs written by Sam Smith (singer)